Savai'i Public Library is the only public library on the island of Savai'i, the largest and westernmost island in Samoa.

The library is situated by the old market in the township of Salelologa at the east end of the island.

It is also referred to as Salelologa Library or Salafai Library' (Salafai is another name for the island of Savai'i).

Savai'i Public Library is a branch of Samoa's central public library, the Nelson Memorial Public Library, situated in the capital Apia on Upolu island.

Library services in Samoa are administered by the Ministry of Education, Sports and Culture.

References

External links
Library Association of Samoa website

Education in Samoa
Libraries in Samoa
Savai'i